Georgia competed at the 2022 Winter Paralympics in Beijing, China which took place between 4–13 March 2022.

Competitors
The following is the list of number of competitors participating at the Games per sport/discipline.

Cross-country skiing

Temuri Dadiani competed in cross-country skiing. He also represented Georgia at the 2018 Winter Paralympics held in Pyeongchang, South Korea.

Men's distance

Sprint

See also
Georgia at the Paralympics
Georgia at the 2022 Winter Olympics

References

Nations at the 2022 Winter Paralympics
2022
Winter Paralympics